Morton Tinmouth is a hamlet of a few farms in County Durham, England. It is situated a few miles to the north-west of Darlington close to the village of Bolam (where population information is maintained).

References

Villages in County Durham